Mulguraea is a genus of flowering plants belonging to the family Verbenaceae.

Its native range is Peru to southern South America. It is found in the countries of Argentina, Bolivia, Chile and Peru.

The genus name of Mulguraea is in honour of María E. Múlgura (b. 1943), an Argentinian botanist. She was also a curator and professor at the Instituto de Botánica Darwinion, San Isidro, Buenos Aires, and also specialist in Junellia. 
It was first described and published in Syst. Bot. Vol.34 on page 782 in 2009.

Known species
According to Kew:
Mulguraea arequipensis 
Mulguraea asparagoides 
Mulguraea aspera 
Mulguraea cedroides 
Mulguraea cinerascens 
Mulguraea echegarayi 
Mulguraea hystrix 
Mulguraea ligustrina 
Mulguraea scoparia 
Mulguraea tetragonocalyx 
Mulguraea tridens

References

Verbenaceae
Verbenaceae genera
Plants described in 2009
Flora of Bolivia
Flora of Peru
Flora of southern South America